Ptichodis agrapta is a moth of the family Erebidae. It is found on Guyana.

References

Moths described in 1913
Ptichodis
Moths of South America